Sky Harbor Airport & Seaplane Base or Sky Harbor Airport  is a public airport in Duluth, Minnesota, United States. It is located near the Wisconsin border, between Superior Bay and Lake Superior. The airport is six nautical miles (11 km) southeast of the central business district of Duluth, Minnesota, on Minnesota Point within its city limits.

The airport is owned by the Duluth Airport Authority and has been operating for over 50 years. It is one of only four airports in Minnesota offering both a hard surface runway for airplanes and water landing areas for seaplanes.

Although most U.S. airports use the same three-letter location identifier for the FAA and IATA, Sky Harbor Airport is assigned DYT by the FAA but has no designation from the IATA.

Facilities and aircraft 
It also has two seaplane landing areas: 9W/27W is 5,000 by 1,500 feet (1,524 x 457 m) and 13W/31W is 10,000 by 2,000 feet (3,048 x 610 m).

Protecting old-growth pine trees on the south east end of the runway prompted a $13.2 million project which realigned the runway by 5 degrees and changed the runway length to 2600 feet with no displaced thresholds. The airport reopened with its newly resurfaced runway on June 12, 2020. The runway realignment created seven acres of new land for the southeast end of the runway along the edge of Park Point, in order to angle the runway into the bay rather than toward the forest. The old Runway 32 had a displaced threshold 658 ft past the beginning of the hard surface, leaving 2,392 ft for landing.

For the 12-month period ending April 30, 2018, the airport had 13,900 aircraft operations, an average of 38 per day: 94% general aviation and 6% air taxi. In 2018, there were 24 aircraft based at this airport: 21 single-engine and 3 multi-engine.

History 
Sky Harbor Airport was founded in 1946 by Jack Brockway and William Neukom.

References

External links 
 Aerial image as of June 1997 from USGS The National Map

Airports in Minnesota
Seaplane bases in the United States
Buildings and structures in Duluth, Minnesota
Transportation in Duluth, Minnesota
Airports established in 1946
1946 establishments in Minnesota